The NER Class T (LNER Class Q5) was a class of 0-8-0 steam locomotives of the North Eastern Railway.

Sub-classes
There were two NER sub-classes.  Class T had piston valves, while class T1 had slide valves.  The London and North Eastern Railway classified both types as Q5.

Between 1932 and 1934, the LNER rebuilt fourteen Q5s with larger boilers and these were given the sub-class Q5/2.  The unrebuilt locomotives were re-classified Q5/1.

References 

0-8-0 locomotives
T
Railway locomotives introduced in 1901
Railway Operating Division locomotives
Standard gauge steam locomotives of Great Britain

Freight locomotives